Jatinder Sidhu (born 1952) is a Canadian politician, who represented the riding of Mission—Matsqui—Fraser Canyon in the House of Commons of Canada from 2015 until his defeat in the 2019 Canadian federal election.

Previously an entrepreneur, Sidhu entered politics after many years of community activism and volunteer service.

Electoral record

References

Living people
Liberal Party of Canada MPs
Members of the House of Commons of Canada from British Columbia
Canadian farmers
Canadian politicians of Punjabi descent
21st-century Canadian politicians
Canadian politicians of Indian descent
Indian emigrants to Canada
1952 births